Kenneth Emery Levey (4 May 1923 – 18 February 1985) was an Australian rules footballer who played with Melbourne in the Victorian Football League (VFL).

Notes

External links 		
		

		
1923 births		
Australian rules footballers from Victoria (Australia)			
Melbourne Football Club players
1985 deaths